Dinh III Bao Dai (Third Mansion of Bao Dai) is an historic mansion in Da Lat, Vietnam, that served as the summer palace for Bao Dai, the last emperor of the Nguyen dynasty.  The European-styled mansion was built between 1933 and 1939 using a design by architect Paul Veysseyre 

Dinh III is a two story mansion situated on a hill in the Love Forest.  It has front and back flower gardens.

The ground floor of Dinh III was used to entertain foreign dignitaries and government officials in formal ceremonies. The front door is approximately 4 meters wide. It leads to a main hall, which is an entrance to the reception room and working rooms. Bao Dai's office situated on the right side with the library. The left side holds the meeting and conference rooms. A drawing room is located more inwards than the other rooms; this is a place for relaxing and entertaining activities.
The ground floor was designed with passages between rooms and exterior spaces. On the wall of the stateroom is the picture of Angkor Wat, a gift to Bao Dai from the Cambodian King.

The second floor of Dinh III contained the bedrooms of the Queen, the Princes and Princesses. The "Moonlight Balcony" was a sitting area for Bao Dai and his queen on full-moon nights

References 

Buildings and structures in Lâm Đồng province